The Anti Tour was the thirteenth concert tour by Australian recording artist Kylie Minogue, as part of the "K25" project. The tour began on 18 March 2012 in Melbourne, Australia at the Palace Theatre and concluded on 3 April 2012 in London, England at the Hammersmith Apollo, consisting of four shows in Australia and three shows in the United Kingdom.

In contrast to Minogue's previous tours, the singer only performed B-sides, demos and rare tracks, on a short strip of concerts in smaller venues, to a reduced crowd and intimate setting.

Background 
In April 2011, during the Aphrodite: Les Folies Tour, Minogue talked about the Anti Tour conception:

Because the first two shows in Australia sold out only minutes after the tickets went on sale, Minogue announced that she would perform second shows on both dates. On 25 March, Minogue announced that she would be performing two shows in the United Kingdom during April (including one at the Hammersmith Apollo, where she had previously performed her 2003 Money Can't Buy show). Both UK shows sold out within ten minutes but quickly found their way on resale sites at discounted rates. Due to huge demand, a second show in Manchester was announced.

Critical response 
The tour received universal acclaim from music critics. Emily Jupp from The Independent gave the concert a five star review stating that Minogue was "[She’s] warm and sassy" and
"Graceful [...] like a magical joy-sharing fairy, sprinkling euphoria across the crowd". About the staging of the show, Jupp said that "There’s no choreography and just one slight costume change but she proves she doesn’t need theatrics." concluding that "She didn’t even need the glitter; she sparkled brightly all by herself." Michael Wilton from musicOMH gave the concert a favorable review, awarding it with four stars, stating that "Backed by a stripped-down, well-rehearsed four-piece band and three backing singers, Kylie had to rely solely on her command of the stage. Although Kylie will not go down in history as one of pop’s great voices, her vocal control and delivery has improved dramatically, and for the most part, she exceeded possibly even her own expectations." Wilton said that "even though the show still had a structured sheen, Kylie was completely relaxed, joking with fans, giggling when she forgot the lines to a song, and dancing to the beat of her own drum on stage." He concluded his review by saying that "25 years later, she’s still clearly enjoying herself, and more importantly, eternally grateful to her fans." Dianne Bourne of the Manchester Evening News notes that Minogue "has been the undoubted queen of the Manchester Arena over the past 10 years, performing more concerts to more fans than any other female artist", describing her concert as "undoubtedly something magical."

Set list 
This set list represents songs performed at all shows.

 "Magnetic Electric" (a bonus track on the Southern Asia tour edition of X)
 "Made in Heaven" (the B-side to Je ne sais pas pourquoi)
 "Cherry Bomb" (a B-side to Wow and Latin American bonus track from X)
 "B.P.M." (the B-side to I Believe in You)
 "Mighty Rivers" (bonus track from the iTunes Deluxe Edition of Aphrodite)
 "I'm Over Dreaming (Over You)" (from Enjoy Yourself)
 "Always Find the Time" (from Rhythm of Love)
 "You're the One" (an unreleased track from the Impossible Princess sessions)
 "Tightrope" (a B-side to In Your Eyes and Australian bonus track from Fever)
 "Paper Dolls" (a B-side to Spinning Around)
 "Stars" (from X)
 "Drunk" (from Impossible Princess)
 "Say Hey" (from Impossible Princess)
 "Too Much" (from Aphrodite)
 "Bittersweet Goodbye" (from Light Years)
 "Disco Down" (from Light Years)
 "I Don't Need Anyone" (from Impossible Princess)
 "Got to Be Certain" (from Kylie)
 "Things Can Only Get Better" (from Rhythm of Love)
Encore
 "Tears on My Pillow" (from Enjoy Yourself)
 "Enjoy Yourself" (from Enjoy Yourself)

Notes
 "That's Why They Write Love Songs" (an unreleased track from the X sessions) was performed as the first song of the encore at all Australian shows. On 2 April the song was performed as the last song before the encore.
 "Do It Again" (a B-Side to Wow and Mexican bonus track from X) was performed as the first song of the encore at all shows in England.
 "It's No Secret" (from Kylie) was performed impromptu at all shows in England.
 "One Boy Girl" (from Rhythm of Love) was performed during the encore at the 2 and 3 April shows.
 "Give Me Just a Little More Time" (from Let's Get to It) was performed impromptu on 3 April.
 "What Kind of Fool (Heard All That Before)" had a snippet performed during a show in Melbourne and one in Manchester.

Shows 

Notes
 Two shows were performed during the same night at these dates.

References

External links 
Kylie.com — Kylie Minogue's official website

Kylie Minogue concert tours
2012 concert tours
2012 in Australian music
2012 in England
2012 in London
2010s in Melbourne
2010s in Sydney
History of Manchester
2012 in British music